Knockbridge is a village in County Louth, Ireland. It is located in the townland of Ballinlough (Baile an Locha) in the historical barony of Dundalk Upper. As of the 2016 census, the village had a population of 667 people. Knockbridge won a "best kept village" award in the 2008 Tidy Towns competition.

Facilities
The village is centred on a crossroads, where there is a pub and a shop. There are four housing estates, a Roman Catholic church and a large primary school in the village.

Stephenstown House, a large ruined Georgian house, once owned by a branch of the Fortescue family, stands beside the River Fane about a mile outside the village. Stephenstown Pond, about a hundred metres from the house, was redeveloped in the mid-1990s and is a public amenity. Stephenstown Pond has a conference centre and an  community enterprise space.

Knockbridge Church (St Mary's) has a number of Harry Clarke designed stained-glass windows.

History

The  village takes its name from "Cnoic Bhríde" - Bridget's Hill - reputed to be a site connected with local Saint Bridget. Nearby is Clochafarmore, where the legendary hero Cú Chulainn is reputed to have died.

Sport
The village's Gaelic football team, St. Brides GFC, was founded by Seamus Quinn, the parish priest in 1927. The club plays in Páirc an Chuinnigh, which was bought as a memorial to Quinn who died in 1952. The grounds were opened on 1 May 1955. The club competes in the Louth Senior Division.

The local hurling club, Knockbridge GAA, has won the Louth Senior Hurling Championship twelve times.

Location and transport
The village is 75 km north of Dublin Airport. Bus Éireann provides bus routes to and from Knockbridge.

See also
 List of towns and villages in Ireland

References

External links
 Knockbridge National School, County Louth
 Knockbridge Vintage Club
 St. Brides GFC, Knockbridge

Towns and villages in County Louth